Patrick Peter Owen Adams (March 17, 1950 – June 22, 2022) was an American music arranger and record producer. He earned 32 gold and platinum records.

Career
He was known primarily for his production, songwriting and engineering work on the New York-based Salsoul Records, Prelude Records and major record labels as well as his associations with various recording artists such as Black Ivory (1970s), Inner Life, Jocelyn Brown, Loleatta Holloway, R. Kelly, Keith Sweat, Teddy Riley, Salt-N-Pepa, Leroy Burgess and bands (The Universal Robot Band, Logg and Musique). In addition, Adams worked with rap, hip-hop/R&B  and dance/club acts such as Coolio, Cathy Dennis, Keith Sweat, Teddy Riley, R. Kelly, Eric B. & Rakim, Salt-N-Pepa and Shades of Love. He owned and operated PAPMUS (Patrick Adams Productions Music) in New York City.

Personal life
Adams was one of three children born in Harlem, New York to Fince and Rose Adams; his father was a merchant seaman. He had two natural children; two daughters (C. Joi Sanchez and Tira Adams) and a step-son (Malcolm A. Holmes), though he never married. Adams died on June 22, 2022 in Manhattan, from cancer, at age 72.

Discography
 Black Ivory - Don't Turn Around (1971)
 Herbie Mann - Supermann (1978)
 Patrick Adams Presents Phreek (1978) (with Phreek)

Production credits:(selected)
 Musique - "Keep On Jumpin'" (1978)
 Inner Life - "Ain't No Mountain High Enough" (1981)
 Venus Dodson - "Shining" (1979)
 Cloud One - "Disco Juice" (1977)
 The Universal Robot Band - "Doing Anything Tonight" (1978)
 Four Below Zero - "My Baby's Got E.S.P." (1976)
 Paper Dolls - "Get Down Boy" (1976)
 Phreek - "Weekend" (1978)
 Rainbow Brown - "Till You Surrender" (1981)
 Bumble Bee Unlimited - "Lady Bug" (1978)
 The Eight Minutes - "Looking for a Brand New Game" (1973)
 Phreek - "May My Love Be with You" (1978)
 Personal Touch - "It Ain't No Big Thing" (1976)
 The Main Ingredient - "Everything Man" (1977)
 JJ Barnes - "You Owe It to Yourself" (1973)
 Marta Acuna - "Dance, Dance, Dance" (1977)
 Sammy Gordon and the Hip Huggers - "Making Love" (1976)
 Sine - "Happy Is the Only Way" (1977)
 Mary Clark - "Take Me I'm Yours" (1980)
 Debbie Taylor - "Romance Without Finance" (1972)
 Donna McGhee - "I'm a Love Bug" (1978)
 The Universal Robot Band - "Dance and Shake Your Tambourine" (1976)

References

External links
 Soundcloud page
 
 

1950 births
2022 deaths
20th-century African-American musicians
21st-century African-American musicians
Record producers from New York (state)
American disco musicians
American boogie musicians
American soul musicians
Musicians from New York City
People from Harlem